The Inter County Football League was formed in 1905 in Scotland as one of several supplementary football leagues that were created in order to increase the number of fixtures for Scottish Football League clubs.

Member clubs of the original competition included Abercorn (1904–1906), Albion Rovers (1904–1906), Arthurlie (1904–1905), Ayr (1904–1906) and Vale of Leven (1905–1906). 

The competition was played out in a knockout format in 1906–07, known that season as the Inter County Shield, but competition was unfinished because the final was never played.
 
The competition was re-formed in 1916–17 with Albion Rovers, Dumbarton Harp, Queen's Park Strollers XI, Renton and Stevenston United. Dykehead, Royal Albert and Wishaw Thistle all resigned.

References

See also 
 Scottish Football (Defunct Leagues)

Defunct football leagues in Scotland
1904 establishments in Scotland
Sports leagues established in 1904
Sports leagues disestablished in 1906
1906 disestablishments in Scotland

he:ליגות כדורגל מוספות#ליגת הכדורגל הבין-מחוזית